Elías Regules (1861–1929) was a Uruguayan physician, teacher, writer and politician.

He was a member of the Constitutional Party.

Works

Poetry 
Mi tapera (1894)
Pasto de cuchilla (1904)
Renglones sobre postales (1908)
Veinte centésimos de versos (1911)
Mi pago (1924)
Versitos criollos (1924)

Theatre 
"Martín Fierro" (1890),
"El entenao" (1892)
"Los gauchitos" (1894)

External links
 

19th-century Uruguayan poets
Uruguayan male poets
University of the Republic (Uruguay) alumni
Academic staff of the University of the Republic (Uruguay)
University of the Republic (Uruguay) rectors
20th-century Uruguayan physicians
Constitutional Party (Uruguay) politicians
1861 births
1929 deaths
20th-century Uruguayan poets
19th-century male writers
20th-century Uruguayan male writers
19th-century Uruguayan physicians